The 2007 Miami Valley Silverbacks season was the second season for the Continental Indoor Football League (CIFL) franchise. After the season, the team decided to move to the Continental Indoor Football League, along with their brother franchise, the Steubenville Stampede, signing a three-year contract with the league. Team owner Jeff Kolaczkowski cited, "This will cut down on the team's operating expenses as well as build strong rivalries." The Silverbacks had a rude welcome to the CIFL, when defending league champion, the Port Huron Pirates, defeated the Silverbacks 54-7. The team bounced back and finished with a 4-9 record and a chance to win a qualifying playoff game. They lost 60-28 to the Chicago Slaughter, failing to make the playoffs.

Schedule

2007 standings

References

2007 Continental Indoor Football League season
Dayton Sharks
2007 in sports in Ohio